The Pirc Defence (pronounced  ) is a chess opening characterised by the response of Black to 1.e4 with 1...d6 and 2...Nf6, followed by ...g6 and ...Bg7, while allowing White to establish a  with pawns on d4 and e4. It is named after the Slovenian grandmaster Vasja Pirc.

The Pirc Defence is usually defined by the opening sequence 
1. e4 d6 
2. d4 Nf6 
3. Nc3 g6

This is the most commonly played line after Black responds to 1.e4 with 1...d6. It has been claimed to give rise to somewhat interesting and exciting games, where Black will have  but has to be cautious about playing too passively. According to Garry Kasparov, the Pirc Defence is "hardly worth using in the tournaments of the highest category", as it gives White "too many opportunities for anybody's liking".

Description
The Pirc Defence, named after Slovenian grandmaster Vasja Pirc, is a relatively new opening; while it was seen on occasion in the late nineteenth century, it was considered irregular, thus remaining a sideline. Its first appearance in a World Championship match was in 1972, when it was played by Bobby Fischer against Boris Spassky at Reykjavík (game 17); the game ended in a draw.

Hooper and Whyld gave a distinct formal definition, 1.d4 d6 2.e4 Nf6 3.Nc3 g6, permuting White's first two moves, although they qualified the definition by remarking that 1.e4 d6 could also transpose to the Pirc.  The presence or absence of Black's third move in the Pirc is reported differently, according to the source; with the pawn move 3...g6, Black prepares to fianchetto the king's bishop to g7.  Paul van der Sterren therefore described 3...g6 as "the defining move of the Pirc Defence" because the development of the bishop to g7 "creates the same sort of positional tension as the King's Indian Defence".

A distinction is usually drawn between the Pirc and lines where Black delays the development of his knight to f6, or omits it altogether; this is known as the Modern or Robatsch Defence.  The tenth edition of Modern Chess Openings (1965) grouped the Pirc and Robatsch together as the "Pirc–Robatsch Defense".

Main line: 3...g6

Austrian Attack: 4.f4 
 
 
The Austrian Attack begins 1.e4 d6 2.d4 Nf6 3.Nc3 g6 4.f4 Bg7 5.Nf3, and was a favourite of Fischer. It is also well respected by Nick de Firmian, the author of Modern Chess Openings. This direct, aggressive line is one of the most ambitious systems against the Pirc. Jan Timman has played the Austrian successfully with both colours. Yuri Balashov does well with the white pieces, and Valery Beim has an impressive score on the black side.

5...0-0
The most frequently played move after 5...0-0 is 6.Bd3 (the Weiss Variation), with 6...Nc6 the most common response, though 6....Na6, with the idea of ....Nc7, ....Rb8 and ....b5 became popular in the 1980s after 6....Nc6 was found to offer Black few winning chances. 6.e5 is a  try, with unclear consequences, which was much played in the 1960s, though it has never attained popularity at the highest levels. 6.Be2 is another move which was often seen in the 1950s and early 1960s, although the defeat sustained by Fischer in the game given in the example games spurred White players, including Fischer, to turn to 6.Bd3. In the 1980s, 6.Be2 c5 7.dxc5 Qa5 8.0-0 Qxc5+ 9.Kh1 was revived with more favourable results. 6.Be3 is another possibility, explored in the 1970s.

5...c5
Black's chief alternative to 5...0-0 lies in an immediate strike against the white centre with 5...c5, to which the usual response is either 6.dxc5 or 6.Bb5+. The former allows 6...Qa5. The latter promises a tactical melee, with a common line being 6.Bb5+ Bd7 7.e5 Ng4 8.e6 (8.h3 or 8.Bxd7+ are other possibilities) 8...fxe6, which was thought bad, until Yasser Seirawan played the move against Gyula Sax in 1988 (8...Bxb5 is the alternative, if Black does not want the forced draw in the main line), continuing 9.Ng5 Bxb5 Now if White tries 10.Nxe6, Black has 10...Bxd4!, ignoring the threat to his queen, in view of 11.Nxd8 Bf2+ 12.Kd2 Be3+ with a draw by perpetual check. White can instead try 11.Nxb5, with complicated play.

White can also essay the sharp 6.e5 against 5...c5, after which 6...Nfd7 7.exd6 0-0 is considered to offer good play for Black.

Classical (Two Knights) System: 4.Nf3 

The Classical (Two Knights) System begins 1.e4 d6 2.d4 Nf6 3.Nc3 g6 4.Nf3 Bg7 5.Be2 0-0 6.0-0. White contents themselves with the 'classical'  with pawns at e4 and d4, forgoing the committal move f2–f4 as Black castles and builds a compact structure. Efim Geller, Anatoly Karpov and Evgeni Vasiukov have all successfully used this system for White; Zurab Azmaiparashvili has scored well as Black. This transposes into the Sicilian Dragon after 6...c5 7.Be3 cxd4 8.Nxd4.

The 150 and Argentine Attacks
The setup f2–f3, Be3 and Qd2 is commonly used against the King's Indian Defence and Dragon Sicilian, and can also be used against the Pirc; indeed, this system is as old as the Pirc itself.

The system 4.f3 was introduced by Argentine players c. 1930 and again in 1950. It was never considered dangerous for Black because of 4.f3 Bg7 5.Be3 c6 6.Qd2 b5. It received a severe blow in about 1985, when Gennady Zaichik showed that Black could castle anyway and play a dangerous gambit with 5...0-0 6.Qd2 e5.

The Argentines feared the sally ...Ng4, though some British players (especially Mark Hebden, Paul Motwani, Gary Lane, later also Michael Adams) came to realise that this was mainly dangerous for Black, therefore playing Be3 and Qd2 in all sorts of move orders, while omitting f2–f3. They called this the 150 Attack, because players of this strength (150 ECF) can easily play this position and get strong play without any theory.

The original Argentine idea probably is only viable after 4.Be3 Bg7 5.Qd2 0-0 6.0-0-0 c6 (or Nc6) 7.f3 b5 8.h4. Black usually does not castle though and prefers 5...c6 or even 4...c6. The question of whether and when to insert Nf3 remains unclear.

Other systems
 4.Bg5 was introduced by Robert Byrne in the 1960s, after which Black has often played the natural 4...Bg7, though 4...c6 is considered more flexible, as Black may wish to save a tempo in anticipation of White's plan of Qd2, followed by Bh6, by deferring ...Bg7 as long as possible, playing for  activity with ...b7–b5 and ...Qa5. White's idea of Qd2 and Bh6 may give a transposition to the lines with Be3 and Qd2. A less common method of playing this system is 4.Nf3 Bg7 5.Bg5.
 4.Bf4. This formerly rare move has become more popular lately, in large part because the position can come about via a fashionable line of the London System: 1.d4 Nf6 2.Bf4 g6 3.Nc3 d6 4.e4.  
 4.Bc4 Bg7 5.Qe2 is a sharp try for advantage; 5...Nc6 can lead to hair-raising complications after 6.e5, when Black's best line may be 6...Ng4 7.e6 Nxd4 8.Qxg4 Nxc2+, avoiding the more frequently played 6...Nxd4 7.exf6 Nxe2 8.fxg7 Rg8 9.Ngxe2 Rxg7, which has been generally considered to lead to an equal or unclear position, though White has scored heavily in practice. 6...Nd7 is now considered fine for Black, in view of 7.e6 fxe6 8.Qxe6 Nde5! 9.Qd5 e6 with advantage to Black. If White instead plays the better 7.Nf3, Black has multiple  choices, including 7...0-0 and 7...Nb6 (followed by ...Na5), which is considered to equalise. Another possibility for Black is 5...c6, though 6.e5 dxe5 7.dxe5 Nd5 8.Bd2, followed by long castling, gives White the advantage, as Black's position is cramped and he lacks active counterplay. 
 4.g3 and 5.Bg2, followed by Nge2, is a solid line, which was sometimes adopted by Karpov.
 4.Be3 is another alternative. Considered relatively passive in earlier times, today's practice uses this move as a flexible entry into lines which may feature h3/Nf3 or even h3/g4/Bg2 – while still maintaining the option of returning to 150-like plans or the Austrian if Black commits to moves that do not help in this type of position.
 4.Be2 may transpose into the Classical System after 4...Bg7 5.Nf3, or White may try one of two highly aggressive lines, the Bayonet Attack (5.h4) or the Chinese Variation (5.g4).

Early deviations
After 1.e4 d6 2.d4 Nf6 3.Nc3, Black has an alternative to 3...g6 (Main line) known as the Pribyl System or Czech Defence, beginning 3...c6.

A common deviation by Black in recent practice is 1.e4 d6 2.d4 Nf6 3.Nc3 e5. This has been tried by many GMs over the years, including Zurab Azmaiparashvili and Christian Bauer. White's 4.dxe5 is known to be equal, and play normally continues 4...dxe5 5.Qxd8+ Kxd8 6.Bc4 Be6 7.Bxe6 fxe6. Instead, White normally transposes to the Philidor Defence with 4.Nf3.

An unusual deviation for Black is 1.e4 d6 2.d4 Nf6 3.Nc3 e6, which can transpose to the Scheveningen Variation of the Sicilian Defence after 4.Nf3 Be7 5.Bb5+ c6 6.Be2 0-0 7.Be3 c5 8.0-0 cxd4 9.Nxd4.

An unusual but quite reasonable deviation for White is 1.e4 d6 2.d4 Nf6 3.f3. At the 1989 Barcelona World Cup event, former world champion Garry Kasparov surprised American grandmaster Yasser Seirawan with this move. After 3...g6 4.c4, an unhappy Seirawan found himself defending the King's Indian Defence for the first time in his life, though he managed to draw the game. Black can avoid a King's Indian with 3...e5, which may lead to an Old Indian type of position after 4.d5, with 3...c5, which may lead to a Benoni type of position after 4.d5 or transpose to Prins Variation of the Sicilian Defence after 4.Ne2 cxd4 5.Nxd4, or with 3...d5. This can transpose to the Classical Variation of the French Defence after 4.e5 Nfd7 5.f4 e6 6.Nf3, to the Tarrasch Variation of the French Defence after 4.e5 Nfd7 5.f4 e6 6.c3 c5 7.Nd2 Nc6 8.Ndf3, or even to the Blackmar–Diemer Gambit with an extra tempo for White after 4.Nc3 dxe4 5.Bg5 exf3 6.Nxf3.

Example games
In the following game, Azmaiparashvili uses the Pirc to defeat reigning world chess champion Karpov. Karpov vs. Azmaiparashvili, USSR Championship, Moscow 1983 1.e4 d6 2.d4 g6 3.Nf3 Nf6 4.Nc3 Bg7 5.Be2 0-0 6.0-0 Bg4 7.Be3 Nc6 8.Qd2 e5 9.d5 Ne7 10.Rad1 b5 11.a3 a5 12.b4 axb4 13.axb4 Ra3 14.Bg5 Rxc3 15.Bxf6 Bxf3 16.Bxf3 Ra3 17.Bxg7 Kxg7 18.Ra1 Qa8 19.Rxa3 Qxa3 20.Be2 Qb2 21.Rd1 f5 22.exf5 Nxf5 23.c3 Qxd2 24.Rxd2 Ra8 25.Bxb5 Ra3 26.Rc2 Ne7 27.f4 exf4 28.Bc6 Nf5 29.Kf2 Ne3 30.Rc1 Kf6 31.g3 Ke5 32.Kf3 g5 33.gxf4+ gxf4 34.h4 Nxd5 35.Bxd5 Kxd5 36.Kxf4 Kc4 37.Re1 Rxc3 38.Re7 Kxb4 39.Rxh7 d5 40.Ke5 c6 41.Kd4 Rc4+ 
Kasparov vs. Veselin Topalov, Wijk aan Zee 1999.  Called Kasparov's Immortal, this game has been called "the most famous Pirc game of all time".1.e4 d6 2.d4 Nf6 3.Nc3 g6 4.Be3 Bg7 5.Qd2 c6 6.f3 b5 7.Nge2 Nbd7 8.Bh6 Bxh6 9.Qxh6 Bb7 10.a3 e5 11.0-0-0 Qe7 12.Kb1 a6 13.Nc1 0-0-0 14.Nb3 exd4 15.Rxd4 c5 16.Rd1 Nb6 17.g3 Kb8 18.Na5 Ba8 19.Bh3 d5 20.Qf4+ Ka7 21.Rhe1 d4 22.Nd5 Nbxd5 23.exd5 Qd6 24.Rxd4 cxd4 25.Re7+ Kb6 26.Qxd4+ Kxa5 27.b4+ Ka4 28.Qc3 Qxd5 29.Ra7 Bb7 30.Rxb7 Qc4 31.Qxf6 Kxa3 32.Qxa6+ Kxb4 33.c3+ Kxc3 34.Qa1+ Kd2 35.Qb2+ Kd1 36.Bf1 Rd2 37.Rd7 Rxd7 38.Bxc4 bxc4 39.Qxh8 Rd3 40.Qa8 c3 41.Qa4+ Ke1 42.f4 f5 43.Kc1 Rd2 44.Qa7 
Mikhail Tal vs. Tigran Petrosian, Moscow 1974 1.Nf3 g6 2.e4 Bg7 3.d4 d6 4.Nc3 Nf6 5.Be2 0-0 6.0-0 Nc6 7.d5 Nb8 8.Re1 e5 9.dxe6 Bxe6 10.Bf4 h6 11.Nd4 Bd7 12.Qd2 Kh7 13.e5 dxe5 14.Bxe5 Ne4 15.Nxe4 Bxe5 16.Nf3 Bg7 17.Rad1 Qc8 18.Bc4 Be8 19.Neg5+ hxg5 20.Nxg5+ Kg8 21.Qf4 Nd7 22.Rxd7 Bxd7 23.Bxf7+ 1–0
Fischer vs. Viktor Korchnoi, Curaçao 1962 1.e4 d6 2.d4 Nf6 3.Nc3 g6 4.f4 Bg7 5.Nf3 0-0 6.Be2 c5 7.dxc5 Qa5 8.0-0 Qxc5+ 9.Kh1 Nc6 10.Nd2 a5 11.Nb3 Qb6 12.a4 Nb4 13.g4 Bxg4! 14.Bxg4 Nxg4 15.Qxg4 Nxc2 16.Nb5 Nxa1 17.Nxa1 Qc6 18.f5 Qc4 19.Qf3 Qxa4 20.Nc7 Qxa1 21.Nd5 Rae8 22.Bg5 Qxb2 23.Bxe7 Be5 24.Rf2 Qc1+ 25.Rf1 Qh6 26.h3 gxf5 27.Bxf8 Rxf8 28.Ne7+ Kh8 29.Nxf5 Qe6 30.Rg1 a4 31.Rg4 Qb3 32.Qf1 a3 33.Rg3 Qxg3 0–1
Hikaru Nakamura vs. Ilya Smirin, Foxwoods Open 2005 1.e4 g6 2.d4 Bg7 3.Nc3 d6 4.f4 Nf6 5.Nf3 0-0 6.e5 Nfd7 7.h4 c5 8.h5 cxd4 9.hxg6 dxc3 10.gxf7+ Rxf7 11.Bc4 Nf8 12.Ng5 e6 13.Nxf7 cxb2 14.Bxb2 Qa5+ 15.Kf1 Kxf7 16.Qh5+ Kg8 17.Bd3 Qb4 18.Rb1 Bd7 19.c4 Qd2 20.Bxh7+ Nxh7 21.Qxh7+ Kf8 22.Rh4 1–0

ECO codes
Some of the systems employed by White against the Pirc Defence include the following:
4.Bc4 (ECO B07) Kholmov System (4.Bc4 Bg7 5.Qe2)
4.Be2 (ECO B07) sub-variants after 4.Be2 Bg7 include the Chinese Variation, 5.g4, and the Bayonet (Mariotti) Attack, 5.h4
4.Be3 (ECO B07) 150 or "Caveman" Attack (4.Be3 c6 5.Qd2)
4.Bg5 (ECO B07) Byrne Variation
4.g3 (ECO B07) Sveshnikov System
4.Nf3 (ECO B08) Classical (Two Knights) System (sub-variants after 4...Bg7 include 5.h3 and 5.Be2)
4.f4 (ECO B09) Austrian Attack (sub-variants after 4.f4 Bg7 5.Nf3 0-0 include 6.e5, 6.Be2, 6.Bd3 and 6.Be3; also, after 4...Bg7 is 5.Bc4, the Ljubojevic Variation; Black also has the option to move into the Dragon Formation after 5.Nf3 with 5...c5)

See also
 List of chess openings
 List of chess openings named after people

Notes

References

Further reading

John Nunn and Colin McNab, The Ultimate Pirc (Batsford, 1998)
Alexander Chernin and Lev Alburt, Pirc Alert! (London, 2001)
Jacques Le Monnier, La défense Pirc en 60 parties, (Paris, Editions Grasset/Europe Echecs, 1983 for the first edition), 

Chess openings